The Classon Avenue station is a station on the IND Crosstown Line of the New York City Subway. Located at the intersection of Classon and Lafayette Avenues on the border of Bedford–Stuyvesant and Clinton Hill, Brooklyn, it is served at all times by the G train.

History 
This station opened on July 1, 1937, when the entire Crosstown Line was completed between Nassau Avenue and its connection to the IND Culver Line. On this date, the GG was extended in both directions to Smith–Ninth Streets and Forest Hills–71st Avenue.

Under the 2015–2019 Metropolitan Transportation Authority Capital Plan, this station, along with 32 others, was to have undergone a complete overhaul as part of the Enhanced Station Initiative. Updates would have included cellular service, Wi-Fi, USB charging stations, interactive service advisories and maps, and improved signage and station lighting. However, most of these renovations are being deferred until the 2020–2024 Capital Program due to a lack of funding.
In 2019, the MTA announced that this station would become ADA-accessible as part of the agency's 2020–2024 Capital Program.

Station layout

This underground station has two side platforms and two tracks with space for a center track. Both platforms have a light green trim line with a dark green border and name tablets reading "CLASSON AVE." in white sans-serif lettering on a dark green background and light green border. Small "CLASSON" tile captions and directional signs in white lettering on a black background run below the trim line and name tablets. Hunter green (previously dark blue) I-beam columns run along both platforms at regular intervals with alternating ones having the standard black station name plate in white lettering.

The space for an additional center track between the two outer ones was meant for the unbuilt IND Second System. It would have been an extension of the center track at Bedford–Nostrand Avenues, which dead-ends on either side of that station. Railroad south of Classon Avenue, the two tracks curve closer to each other and the center trackway ends.

The south end of the southbound platform and the north end of the northbound one have room for proposed control towers. Those spaces are now used for crew facilities.

Exits
This station has a full length mezzanine above the platforms and tracks supported by dark green i-beam columns, but only the northern half is open to the public and has two staircases to each platform. The fare control area is at the center with a turnstile bank, token booth, and three stairs going up to all corners of Classon and Lafayette Avenues except the northeast one.

References

External links 

 
 Station Reporter — G Train
 The Subway Nut — Classon Avenue Pictures 
 Classon Avenue entrance from Google Maps Street View
 Platforms from Google Maps Street View

IND Crosstown Line stations
New York City Subway stations in Brooklyn
Railway stations in the United States opened in 1937
1937 establishments in New York City
Bedford–Stuyvesant, Brooklyn
Clinton Hill, Brooklyn